Anagennisi Plagia Football Club is a Greek football club based in Plagia, Kilkis, Greece.

Honours

Domestic

 Kilkis FCA Champions: 1
 2019–20
 Kilkis FCA Cup Winners: 2
 2017–18, 2019–20

References

Kilkis
Association football clubs established in 1970
1970 establishments in Greece
Gamma Ethniki clubs